Hordaland is one of the 19 multi-member constituencies of the Storting, the national legislature of Norway. The constituency was established in 1921 following the introduction of proportional representation for elections to the Storting. The Bergen constituency was merged into the Hordaland constituency in 1973 after the city of Bergen lost its county status in 1972. Hordaland consists of the municipalities of Alver, Askøy, Austevoll, Austrheim, Bergen, Bjørnafjorden, Bømlo, Eidfjord, Etne, Fedje, Fitjar, Kvam, Kvinnherad, Masfjorden, Modalen, Osterøy, Øygarden, Samnanger, Stord, Sveio, Tysnes, Ullensvang, Ulvik, Vaksdal and Voss in the county of Vestland. The constituency currently elects 15 of the 169 members of the Storting using the open party-list proportional representation electoral system. At the 2021 parliamentary election it had 382,305 registered electors.

Electoral system
Hordaland currently elects 15 of the 169 members of the Storting using the open party-list proportional representation electoral system. Constituency seats are allocated by the County Electoral Committee using the Modified Sainte-Laguë method. Compensatory seats (seats at large) are calculated based on the national vote and are allocated by the National Electoral Committee using the Modified Sainte-Laguë method at the constituency level (one for each constituency). Only parties that reach the 4% national threshold compete for compensatory seats.

Election results

Summary

(Excludes compensatory seats. Figures in italics represent joint lists.)

Detailed

2020s

2021
Results of the 2021 parliamentary election held on 13 September 2021:

The following candidates were elected:
Nils T. Bjørke (Sp); Liv Kari Eskeland (H); Peter Christian Frølich (H); Silje Hjemdal (FrP); Odd Harald Hovland (Ap); Eigil Knutsen (Ap); Audun Lysbakken (SV); Sofie Marhaug (R): Linda Monsen Merkesdal (Ap); Helge André Njåstad (FrP); Marte Mjøs Persen (Ap); Sveinung Rotevatn (V); Erna Solberg (H); Kjersti Toppe (Sp); Ove Bernt Trellevik (H); and Dag Inge Ulstein (KrF).

2010s

2017
Results of the 2017 parliamentary election held on 11 September 2017:

The following candidates were elected:
Nils T. Bjørke (Sp); Terje Breivik (V); Jette F. Christensen (Ap); Torill Eidsheim (H); Peter Christian Frølich (H); Ruth Mari Grung (Ap); Knut Arild Hareide (KrF); Silje Hjemdal (FrP); Eigil Knutsen (Ap); Audun Lysbakken (SV); Tom-Christer Nilsen (H); Helge André Njåstad (FrP); Magne Rommetveit (Ap); Erna Solberg (H); Kjersti Toppe (Sp); and Ove Bernt Trellevik (H).

2013
Results of the 2013 parliamentary election held on 8 and 9 September 2013:

The following candidates were elected:
Terje Breivik (V); Jette F. Christensen (Ap); Torill Eidsheim (H); Peter Christian Frølich (H); Ruth Mari Grung (Ap); Gjermund Hagesæter (FrP); Øyvind Halleraker (H); Knut Arild Hareide (KrF); Per Rune Henriksen (Ap); Sigurd Hille (H); Audun Lysbakken (SV); Helge André Njåstad (FrP); Magne Rommetveit (Ap); Erna Solberg (H); Kjersti Toppe (Sp); and Ove Bernt Trellevik (H).

2000s

2009
Results of the 2009 parliamentary election held on 13 and 14 September 2009:

The following candidates were elected:
Laila Dåvøy (KrF); Gjermund Hagesæter (FrP); Øyvind Halleraker (H); Per Rune Henriksen (Ap); Audun Lysbakken (SV); Hilde Magnusson Lydvo (Ap); Laila Reiertsen (FrP); Magne Rommetveit (Ap); Erna Solberg (H); Arne Sortevik (FrP); Anne-Grete Strøm-Erichsen (Ap); Dag Ole Teigen (Ap); Kjersti Toppe (Sp); Henning Warloe (H); and Karin S. Woldseth (FrP).

2005
Results of the 2005 parliamentary election held on 11 and 12 September 2005:

The following candidates were elected:
Olav Akselsen (Ap); Laila Dåvøy (KrF); Gjermund Hagesæter (FrP); Øyvind Halleraker (H); Torbjørn Hansen (H); Per Rune Henriksen (Ap); Hilde Magnusson Lydvo (Ap); Rune J. Skjælaaen (Sp); Erna Solberg (H); Ingebrigt S. Sørfonn (KrF); Arne Sortevik (FrP); Lars Sponheim (V); Anne-Grete Strøm-Erichsen (Ap); Ågot Valle (SV); and Karin S. Woldseth (FrP).

2001
Results of the 2001 parliamentary election held on 9 and 10 September 2001:

The following candidates were elected:
Olav Akselsen (Ap); Ranveig Frøiland (Ap); Gjermund Hagesæter (FrP); Øyvind Halleraker (H); Torbjørn Hansen (H); Ingmar Ljones (KrF); Leif Lund (Ap); Audun Lysbakken (SV); Oddvard Nilsen (H); Anita Apelthun Sæle (KrF); Rune J. Skjælaaen (Sp); Erna Solberg (H); Ingebrigt S. Sørfonn (KrF); Arne Sortevik (FrP); Lars Sponheim (V); Ågot Valle (SV); and Karin S. Woldseth (FrP).

1990s

1997
Results of the 1997 parliamentary election held on 15 September 1997:

The following candidates were elected:
Olav Akselsen (Ap); John Dale (Sp); Ranveig Frøiland (Ap); Grete Knudsen (Ap); Terje Knudsen (Frp); Leif Lund (Ap); Are Næss (KrF); Oddvard Nilsen (H); Hans J. Røsjorde (FrP); Anita Apelthun Sæle (KrF); Erna Solberg (H); Ingebrigt S. Sørfonn (KrF); Lars Sponheim (V); Rita Tveiten (Ap); Ågot Valle (SV); and May Britt Vihovde (V).

1993
Results of the 1993 parliamentary election held on 12 and 13 September 1993:

The following candidates were elected:
Olav Akselsen (Ap); Hallvard Bakke (Ap); John Dale (Sp); Ranveig Frøiland (Ap); Bjørg Hope Galtung (Sp); Grete Knudsen (Ap); Kjellbjørg Lunde (SV); Are Næss (KrF); Oddvard Nilsen (H); Hans J. Røsjorde (FrP); Anita Apelthun Sæle (KrF); Erna Solberg (H); Lars Sponheim (V); Magnus Stangeland (Sp); and Rita Tveiten (Ap).

1980s

1989
Results of the 1989 parliamentary election held on 10 and 11 September 1989:

The following candidates were elected:
Olav Akselsen (Ap); Svein Alsaker (KrF); Hallvard Bakke (Ap); Ranveig Frøiland (Ap); Nils O. Golten (H); Knut Hanselmann (FrP); Britt Harkestad (KrF); Grete Knudsen (Ap); Kjellbjørg Lunde (SV); Hans J. Røsjorde (FrP); Arne Skauge (H); Erna Solberg (H); Arne Alsåker Spilde (H); Magnus Stangeland (Sp); Leiv Stensland (Ap); and Inger-Marie Ytterhorn (FrP).

1985
Results of the 1985 parliamentary election held on 8 and 9 September 1985:

As the list alliance was not entitled to more seats contesting as an alliance than it was contesting as individual parties, the distribution of seats was as party votes.

The following candidates were elected:
Svein Alsaker (KrF); Hallvard Bakke (Ap); Brita Borge (H); Ranveig Frøiland (Ap); Nils O. Golten (H); Britt Harkestad (KrF); Grete Knudsen (Ap); Bjarne Kristiansen (Ap); Kjellbjørg Lunde (SV); Inger-Lise Skarstein (H); Arne Skauge (H); Arne Alsåker Spilde (H); Magnus Stangeland (Sp); Leiv Stensland (Ap); and Bjørn Erling Ytterhorn (FrP).

1981
Results of the 1981 parliamentary election held on 13 and 14 September 1981:

The following candidates were elected:
Hallvard Bakke (Ap); Mons Espelid (V); Aksel Fossen (Ap); Asbjørn Haugstvedt (KrF); Sverre Helland (Sp); Per Hysing-Dahl (H); Grete Knudsen (Ap); Kjellbjørg Lunde (SV); Arne Nilsen (Ap); Håkon Randal (H); Inger-Lise Skarstein (H); Arne Skauge (H); Arne Alsåker Spilde (H); Hans Olav Tungesvik (KrF); and Bjørn Erling Ytterhorn (FrP).

1970s

1977
Results of the 1977 parliamentary election held on 11 and 12 September 1977:

The following candidates were elected:
Hallvard Bakke (Ap); Aksel Fossen (Ap); Harry Hansen (Ap); Asbjørn Haugstvedt (KrF); Sverre Helland (Sp); Per Hysing-Dahl (H); Georg Johan Jacobsen (Ap); Sverre L. Mo (KrF); Arne Nilsen (Ap); Håkon Randal (H); Inger-Lise Skarstein (H); Arne Skauge (H); Margit Tøsdal (Ap); Hans Olav Tungesvik (KrF); and Sigrid Utkilen (H).

1973
Results of the 1973 parliamentary election held on 9 and 10 September 1973:

The following candidates were elected:
Bergfrid Fjose (KrF); Aksel Fossen (Ap); Harry Hansen (Ap); Asbjørn Haugstvedt (KrF); Sverre Helland (Sp); Per Hysing-Dahl (H); Georg Johan Jacobsen (Ap); Sverre L. Mo (KrF); Ole Myrvoll (DNF); Arne Nilsen (Ap); Einar Nyheim (SV); Håkon Randal (H); Harald Bjarne Slettebø (ALP); Margit Tøsdal (Ap); and Sigrid Utkilen (H).

1960s

1969
Results of the 1969 parliamentary election held on 7 and 8 September 1969:

The following candidates were elected:
Bergfrid Fjose (KrF); Aksel Fossen (Ap); Sverre Helland (Sp); Per Hysing-Dahl (H); Kjeld Langeland (H); Olav Marås (Ap); Sverre L. Mo (KrF); Thor Myklebust (V); Arne Nilsen (Ap); and Ingvald Ulveseth (Ap).

1965
Results of the 1965 parliamentary election held on 12 and 13 September 1965:

The following candidates were elected:
Lars Amandus Aasgard (KrF); Olav Hordvik (V); Kjeld Langeland (H); Lars Leiro (Sp); Kaare Meland (H); Sverre L. Mo (KrF); Thor Myklebust (V); Arne Nilsen (Ap); Steffen Ingebriktsen Toppe (Ap); and Ingvald Ulveseth (Ap).

1961
Results of the 1961 parliamentary election held on 11 September 1961:

The following candidates were elected:
Lars Amandus Aasgard (KrF), 19,016 votes; Isak Larsson Flatabø (Ap), 37,115 votes; Christian L. Holm (H), 13,520 votes; Olav Hordvik (V), 17,373 votes; Torstein Kvamme (KrF), 19,015 votes; Lars Leiro (Sp), 10,831 votes; Jakob Martin Pettersen (Ap), 37,114 votes; Hjalmar Olai Storeide (Ap), 37,118 votes; Margit Tøsdal (Ap), 37,115 votes; and Knut Ytre-Arne (V), 17,375 votes.

1950s

1957
Results of the 1957 parliamentary election held on 7 October 1957:

The following candidates were elected:
Isak Larsson Flatabø (Ap); Christian L. Holm (H); Olav Hordvik (V); Torstein Kvamme (KrF); Lars Leiro (Bp); Ola Olsen (KrF); Jakob Martin Pettersen (Ap); Hjalmar Olai Storeide (Ap); Knut Severin Jakobsen Vik (Ap); and Knut Ytre-Arne (V).

1953
Results of the 1953 parliamentary election held on 12 October 1953:

The following candidates were elected:
Isak Larsson Flatabø (Ap); Christian L. Holm (H); Olav Hordvik (V); Ola Høyland (Bp); Torstein Kvamme (KrF); Ola Olsen (KrF); Jakob Martin Pettersen (Ap); Hjalmar Olai Storeide (Ap); Knut Severin Jakobsen Vik (Ap); and Knut Ytre-Arne (V).

1940s

1949
Results of the 1949 parliamentary election held on 10 October 1949:

The following candidates were elected:
Isak Larsson Flatabø (Ap); Haldor Andreas Haldorsen (V); Christian L. Holm (H); Nils Lavik (KrF); Jakob Martin Pettersen (Ap); Ole Jensen Rong (Ap); Hans Svarstad (KrF); and Knut Ytre-Arne (V).

1945
Results of the 1945 parliamentary election held on 8 October 1945:

The following candidates were elected:
Isak Larsson Flatabø (Ap); Haldor Andreas Haldorsen (V); Nils Lavik (KrF); Jakob Martin Pettersen (Ap); Henrik Friis Robberstad (H); Ole Jensen Rong (Ap); Hans Svarstad (KrF); and Nils Tveit (V).

1930s

1936
Results of the 1936 parliamentary election held on 19 October 1936:

As the list alliance was not entitled to more seats contesting as an alliance than it was contesting as individual parties, the distribution of seats was as party votes.

The following candidates were elected:
Kornelius Bergsvik (Ap); Ivar Johannesson Bleiklie (HV); Gustav Bernhard Forstrøm (Ap); Nils Lavik (KrF); Knut Markhus (V); Olav Myklebust (V); Hans Svarstad (KrF); and Jakob Nilsson Vik (Bp).

1933
Results of the 1933 parliamentary election held on 16 October 1933:

As the list alliance was entitled to more seats contesting as an alliance than it was contesting as individual parties, the distribution of seats was as list alliance votes. The HV-BS list alliance's seat was allocated to the Hordaland Voters Association.

The following candidates were elected:
Ivar Johannesson Bleiklie (HV); Kornelius Bergsvik (Ap); Gustav Bernhard Forstrøm (Ap); Mons A. Kårbø (V); Nils Lavik (KrF); Ole Monsen Mjelde (V); Olav Myklebust (V); and Jakob Nilsson Vik (Bp).

1930
Results of the 1930 parliamentary election held on 20 October 1930:

The following candidates were elected:
Kornelius Bergsvik (Ap); Andreas Johan Rasmusson Garnes (Bp); Mons A. Kårbø (V); Jon Jørundson Mannsåker (V); Ole Monsen Mjelde (V); Wilhelm Mohr (HV); Olav Myklebust (V); and Jakob Nilsson Vik (Bp).

1920s

1927
Results of the 1927 parliamentary election held on 17 October 1927:

The following candidates were elected:
Kornelius Bergsvik (Ap); Andreas Johan Rasmusson Garnes (Bp); Jon Jørundson Mannsåker (V); Knut Markhus (V); Ole Monsen Mjelde (V); Olav Myklebust (V); Lauritz Tvedt (HV); and Jakob Nilsson Vik (Bp).

1924
Results of the 1924 parliamentary election held on 21 October 1924:

The following candidates were elected:
Olaf Josefson Bjørgum (Bp); Ivar Johannesson Bleiklie (HV); Nils Johannessen Finne (V); Sverre Krogh (K); Knut Markhus (V); Ole Monsen Mjelde (V); Olav Myklebust (V); and Lauritz Tvedt (HV).

1921
Results of the 1921 parliamentary election held on 24 October 1921:

The following candidates were elected:
Olaf Josefson Bjørgum (L); Sverre Krogh (Ap); Knut Markhus (V); Ole Monsen Mjelde (V); Wilhelm Mohr (H-FV); Olav Myklebust (V); Nils Nilsson Skaar (V); and Lauritz Tvedt (H-FV).

Notes

References

Storting constituency
Storting constituencies
Storting constituencies established in 1921